The 1977–78 NBA season was the Hawks' 29th season in the NBA and 10th season in Atlanta.

Offseason

Draft picks

Roster

Regular season

Season standings

z – clinched division title
y – clinched division title
x – clinched playoff spot

Record vs. opponents

Playoffs

|- align="center" bgcolor="#ffcccc"
| 1
| April 12
| @ Washington
| L 94–103
| John Drew (25)
| Tom McMillen (14)
| Eddie Johnson (4)
| Capital Centre9,326
| 0–1
|- align="center" bgcolor="#ffcccc"
| 2
| April 14
| Washington
| L 103–107 (OT)
| John Drew (27)
| Drew, McMillen (8)
| Hill, Hawes (5)
| Omni Coliseum15,601
| 0–2
|-

Awards and records
Hubie Brown, NBA Coach of the Year Award

References

Atlanta Hawks seasons
Atlanta
Atlanta
Atlanta